The 2004 Berlin Marathon was the 31st running of the annual marathon race held in Berlin, Germany, held on 26 September 2004. Felix Limo won the men's race in 2:06:44 hours, while the women's race was won by Japan's Yoko Shibui in 2:19:41.

Results

Men

Women

References 

 Results. Association of Road Racing Statisticians. Retrieved 2020-04-02.

External links 
 Official website

2004 in Berlin
Berlin Marathon
Berlin Marathon
Berlin Marathon
Berlin Marathon